Parag Milk Foods is an Indian company that manufactures, markets and sells milk and milk products. The company is India's second largest producer of cheese under its brand Go and the country's largest producer of cow ghee under its brand Govardhan. In 2015, the company began producing whey protein powder and since then has launched branded protein powder products as well. As of 2017, the company's daily procurement of milk was 1.2 million litres.

History
Parag Milk Foods started as a dairy in Manchar with a 20,000 litre capacity in 1992. It concentrated on a niche segment, producing skimmed milk powder and by 2004 became India's largest exporter of the skimmed milk powder. However, the company faced a challenge when the Government of India banned export of milk powder on account of local milk shortage. Thereafter the company began investing in cheese production in 2008. The company invested in a new facility to produce 1200 tonnes of cheese monthly at a time when the country only produced 600 tonnes of cheese a month. Consequently, there was a huge increase in cheese consumption in India with the expansion of quick-service restaurants in the country.

In 2008, Motilal Oswal and IDFC Alternative Fund came in as investors in the company. As of 2013, Cheese, Ghee and Yogurt contributed 75% of the company's annual revenue. The company has a second dairy in Palamaner, Andhra Pradesh.

In 2016, the company turned public with an initial public offering listing on National Stock Exchange and Bombay Stock Exchange.

Brands
The company's brands include Gowardhan, Go, Pride of Cows and Topp Up. The company launched the Go brand in 2009, Pride of Cows in 2012 and Topp Up in 2013. The company sells milk, ghee, dahi and paneer under the Govardhan brand and cheese, milk, chaas, lassi, yoghurt under Go brand. The company is India's second-largest producer of cheese under its brand Go and the country's largest producer of cow ghee under its brand Govardhan.

The company supplies milk directly from farms to customers homes under the brand Pride of Cows. The milk is produced at Bhagyalaxmi Dairy in Manchar, and procured from 3,800 Holstein Freisan cows. The milk is supplied to households in Mumbai, Pune, Surat and is airlifted to customers in New Delhi daily. The company uses an invitation-only mobile application subscription-based distribution model for this brand. In June 2019, Pride of Cows claimed to become the first Indian brand to sell fresh milk in Singapore. The company airlifts the milk from Pune to Singapore daily and uses a home delivery model to reach the product to the end consumer.

In 2015, the company began producing whey protein powder. In 2019, the Parag Milk Foods introduced whey protein produced from cow milk and branded it under the names Go Protein Power and Avvatar. Parag Milk Foods' Avvatar whey protein brand is the first 100% vegetarian whey protein made in India. The company also sells milk based energy drinks under the brand Topp Up.

Acquisitions
In 2018, Parag Milk Foods acquired Danone's facility in Sonipat, Haryana after Danone decided to shut its dairy operations in India. The facility has a milk processing capacity of 75,000 litres a day along with 15 tonnes of yogurt.

References

External links
 Official website

Dairy products companies of India
Companies listed on the National Stock Exchange of India
Companies listed on the Bombay Stock Exchange